Spring Evening was an oil on panel painting completed in 1879 by the German Symbolist painter Arnold Böcklin which belongs in the collection of the Museum of Fine Arts, Budapest.

The painting depicts the god Pan playing his pipes to woodland nymphs, a theme to which Böcklin returned several times.

See also
 100 Great Paintings

References

 

1879 paintings
Paintings by Arnold Böcklin
Paintings in the collection of the Museum of Fine Arts (Budapest)
Pan (god) in art
Musical instruments in art